Cephalobares is a genus of Asian comb-footed spiders that was first described by Octavius Pickard-Cambridge in 1871.  it contains two species, found in Asia: C. globiceps and C. yangdingi.

See also
 List of Theridiidae species

References

Araneomorphae genera
Spiders of Asia
Taxa named by Octavius Pickard-Cambridge
Theridiidae